Christian Piot (born 4 October 1947 in Ougrée) is a retired Belgian football goalkeeper who won the Belgian Golden Shoe in 1972 while at Standard Liège.  He played 40 times and scored 1 goal for the national team between 1969 and 1977, starting in a 0–4 defeat to Yugoslavia on 19 October 1969.  Piot was in the team for the 1970 World Cup and for the Euro 1972.

Honours

Player 
Standard Liege

 Belgian First Division: 1968–69, 1969–70, 1970–71
 Belgian Cup: 1966–67; runners-up: 1971–72, 1972–73
 Belgian League Cup: 1975
 Jules Pappaert Cup: 1971

International

Belgium 

 UEFA European Championship: 1972 (Third place)

Individual 

 Belgian Golden Shoe: 1972

International goals

Source: 11v11

References

External links
 
 Profile at Standard de Liège
 

1947 births
Living people
People from Seraing
Footballers from Liège Province
Belgian footballers
Belgium international footballers
Association football goalkeepers
Belgian Pro League players
Standard Liège players
1970 FIFA World Cup players
UEFA Euro 1972 players
Belgian football managers